Costa Verde may refer to:

Places
 Costa Verde (Brazil)
 Costa Verde (Peru)
 Costa Verde (Portugal)
 Costa Verde (Sardinia), Italy
 Costa Verde (Spain), see Llanes
 Green Coast, a resort in Albania; see

Other uses
 Costa Verde, a fictitious country in Central America from the XIII universe.